The following is a list of current Canadian Football League (CFL) team rosters:

West Division

BC Lions

Calgary Stampeders

Edmonton Elks

Saskatchewan Roughriders

Winnipeg Blue Bombers

East Division

Hamilton Tiger-Cats

Montreal Alouettes

Ottawa Redblacks

Toronto Argonauts

Canadian Football League players
Current team rosters
Canadian Football League